Pheidole psilogaster is a species of ant in the subfamily Myrmicinae. It is distributed across Mexico, Costa Rica, and Nicaragua.

References

psilogaster
Hymenoptera of North America
Insects described in 2003
Taxa named by E. O. Wilson